Metocurine is a muscle relaxant through neuromuscular blockade.
It is excreted entirely through the kidneys and therefore should not be used in patients with kidney failure.

References 

Nicotinic antagonists
Quaternary ammonium compounds